The Same Song is the flagship program of the China Central Television music channel. It is usually recorded in a different outside broadcast location each week.
The theme song with the same name is usually sung by Mao Amin at the end of the program.

External links
Official website (in Chinese)
The Same Song to be sung in Toronto, New York
CCTV in court for alleged copyright violation
People's Daily Online article questioning whether the programme has become over-commercialized

Chinese television shows
China Central Television